Mordellistena mihoki is a species of beetle in the Mordellistena of the family Mordellidae, which is part of the superfamily Tenebrionoidea. It was discovered in 1977, and can be found in such countries as Croatia, Germany, Hungary, Romania,  and Ukraine.

References

Beetles described in 1977
mihoki
Beetles of Europe